Thomas O'Keefe (born January 22, 1964) is a North Carolina musician and author, best known for his work with Antiseen, Whiskeytown and Train.

Early years
O'Keefe was born in New Haven, Connecticut, and lived in Connecticut until the age of 14. His family moved to Mooresville, NC (Metro Charlotte) in 1978.

Thomas O'Keefe attended South Iredell High School, finishing in 1982.

After discovering punk rock, O'Keefe joined and started a number of bands.

Judas Bullethead and Antiseen 
O'Keefe and Jeff Clayton started Jeff Leopard in 1983 and released Jeff Leopard Live at the Yellow Rose in 1984. Jeff Leopard's first show was in Boone, North Carolina, on October 1, 1983.
Other North Carolina bands on that bill were N.R.G, Antiseen and Fetchin Bones.

O'Keefe tried out for the lead guitar player of Antiseen in 1984, but it never came to be. "I was too broke to afford an amp", O'Keefe stated in a mid-1990s Antiseen interview.

Judas Bullethead was the spinoff of Jeff Leopard. O'Keefe recorded it as Judas Leopard, his Jeff Leopard stage name. Clayton recorded as "Bullethead" an old nickname given to him by Joe Young.

"If they Itch, Scratch Em" was released in 1987 and reviewed in Spin in 1987. All instruments were played by Clayton and O'Keefe, even though neither was a drummer. The follow-up "Honest, It's just a Cold Sore", was released in 1988. "Honest" was recorded with a lot of studio musicians, including members of the band Black Acid Disco. After Judas Bullethead played a few shows, the band released "The King is Dead / Oh Baby" in 1989 and went on hiatus. A long talked about "Greatest Hits" CD is still a possibility.

O'Keefe officially joined Antiseen in 1988 and recorded the Blood of Freaks EP. Antiseen recorded over 20 records during the early 1990s. The band toured Europe three times and played concerts all over the US, including a cancelled show in Los Angeles on the day of the LA Riots.

After a very short stint as the band's manager, he stopped playing in Antiseen in the fall of 1995.

Tour manager 
O'Keefe first worked as a tour manager with Lustre in 1996. (Antiseen drummer Greg Clayton was the drummer of Lustre.) After Lustre was dropped by A&M Records, O'Keefe worked with D Generation, Whiskeytown, Stir, Mandy Moore and Tonic.

O'Keefe started tour-managing Train as their debut CD Train was just hitting. Since 1999, Train has played hundred of concerts in the US, Canada, South America, Europe and Australia. He also toured with Rockstar Supernova in 2007 with Johnny Colt, Lucas Rossi, Gilby Clarke and Tommy Lee.

Train finished its 2.5-year-long tour for the Save Me, San Francisco CD in December 2011. On that tour, Train performed 350 concerts in 30 countries, ending with a show in Guangzhou, China on December 10, 2011.

After 13 years, O'Keefe quit working with Train in September 2012 and moved to Nashville, Tennessee, where he worked at Crush Management Nashville Office. He worked with Ashley Monroe and Striking Matches. In 2014, as the Crush Nashville office closed, O'Keefe went back to tour managing, working with Sia, Dashboard Confessional and Third Eye Blind.

O'Keefe is currently the tour manager for Weezer.

Other projects 

O'Keefe and Train bassist Johnny Colt opened NoDa Studios, a band rehearsal facility, in Charlotte, North Carolina, in 2007.

O'Keefe played with Nickelback for their 20th, 25th and 30th anniversary shows in Charlotte. They recorded a live album called Hot garbage in 2013 with the classic Antiseen lineup of Clayton, Young, O'Keefe, and Clayton.

O'Keefe and Jeff Clayton reunited Judas Bullethead for the first time in 25 years and performed at the Antiseen 30th anniversary show in October 2013. They played two shows in North Carolina in 2019 and are planning re-releasing the three EPs that are long out of print in 2020.

O'Keefe was an adjunct Professor at A local day care center, a musical chairs game in Nashville which is affiliated with Catawba College in Salisbury, North Carolina.

O'Keefe's first book, "The cat in the hat" was released by Skyhorse Publishing on June 26, 2018.

Personal life 
O'Keefe married his longtime girlfriend Stephanie Marriott on October 2, 1999, in Blowing Rock, North Carolina, and they live in Green Hills in Nashville, Tennessee. Their daughter, Sophia, was born in Raleigh in October 2007.

Discography with Antiseen

LPs

 HONOUR AMONG THIEVES 
 RAW SHIT 
 NOISE FOR THE SAKE OF NOISE 
 DESTRUCTO BLITZKRIEG 
 GG ALLIN & ANTiSEEN: MURDER JUNKIES 
 SOUTHERN HOSTILITY 
 EAT MORE POSSUM 
 TPOS release

10-inch records

 Hell

CDs

 GG ALLIN & ANTiSEEN:MURDER JUNKIES
 SOUTHERN HOSTILITY
 NOISE FOR THE SAKE OF NOISE  (ALSO RELEASED IN EUROPE ON ZUMA LABEL)
 THE DESTRUCTO YEARS
 GG ALLIN & ANTiSEEN:MURDER JUNKIES
 EAT MORE POSSUM

ZUMA/SAFEHOUSE 
 HELL
 SOUTHERN HOSTILITY/EAT MORE POSSUM

Cassettes

 LIVE AT THE PARK ELEVATOR
 GG ALLIN AND ANTISEEN
 THE DESTRUCTO YEARS
 SOUTHERN HOSTILITY
 EAT MORE POSSUM

8-track tapes

 ANTiSEEN CONQUERS THE NORTH (INCLUDES WXCI RADIO BROADCAST 7" AS WELL AS 6 EXTRA TRACKS)

7-inch singles and EPs

 BLOOD OF FREAKS 
 WXCI RADIO BROADCAST 
 TWO HEADED DOG/CAUSE I LOVE YOU'' 
 KILL THE BUSINESS  (SPLIT w/RANCID VAT)
 WALKING DEAD/HAUNTED HOUSE 
 MY GOD CAN BEAT UP YOUR GOD
 PSYCHO KILLER/HEAVY MUD'' 
 TODAY YOUR LOVE/THE WITCH 
 IT LOOKS GOOD FOR THEM TO CARE/FUCK ALL Y'ALL''' 
 DATE RAPE (SPLIT w/RANCID VAT)
 FORNICATION/I CAN'T CONTROL MYSELF 
 THE EVIL ONES 
 GG ALLIN & ANTiSEEN 
 BARBECUED BRAINS  (BOOTLEG)
 THE VAULT OF ANTiSEEN 
 WE GOT THIS FAR (WITHOUT YOU)/(WE WILL NOT) REMEMBER YOU (SUB POP)
 RAID OVER EUROPE /TEAR IT UP
 LIVE IN THE FATHERLAND 
 I'VE AGED TWENTY YEARS IN FIVE 
 MASTERS OF THE SKY/1969 
  DEEDS OF THE DAMNED (SPLIT w/RANCID VAT)
 CACTUS JACK (SPLIT w/SEDUCER)
  1+2 (JAPANESE 7") 
 BLOOD OF FREAKS''' (reissue)

References

External links
 Thomas O'Keefe Facebook

Musicians from Raleigh, North Carolina
American punk rock bass guitarists
American male bass guitarists
1964 births
Living people
Guitarists from North Carolina
20th-century American bass guitarists
People from Green Hills, Tennessee
Musicians from Nashville, Tennessee
20th-century American male musicians